The Da Vinci Code is a 2006 American mystery-thriller film directed by Ron Howard.  The screenplay was written by Akiva Goldsman and based on Dan Brown's worldwide bestselling 2003 novel, The Da Vinci Code.  It was produced by Howard with John Calley and Brian Grazer and released by Columbia Pictures in the United States on May 19, 2006.

Due to controversial and inaccurate historical interpretations and perceived anti-Catholic elements, the film proved highly controversial in the Philippines, a highly religious country in Southeast Asia in which Catholicism is widely practised. Many organisations protested and organised boycotts against the showing of The Da Vinci Code in the Philippines, and the film was banned from being screened in the Philippine capital of Manila.

Initial reactions
The Philippine Alliance Against Pornography (PAAP) appealed to Philippine President Gloria Macapagal Arroyo to stop the showing of The Da Vinci Code in the Philippines. They branded the film as "the most pornographic and blasphemous film in history" and also requested the help of Pope Benedict XVI, the Catholic Bishops Conference of the Philippines (CBCP) and other religious groups to stop the showing of the film. The PAAP also compared Dan Brown to Adolf Hitler.

However, Cecille Guidote Alvarez, Philippine Presidential Adviser on Culture and the Arts, said Malacañang will not interfere in controversy about the film and leaves the decision to the Movie and Television Classification Board's (MTRCB) rating. Eventually, MTRCB decided to give The Da Vinci Code an R-18 rating (restricted to those under 18 years of age) despite PAAP's opposition for showing it.

Reactions from Philippine Catholic Bishops
Jaro Archbishop Angel Lagdameo, president of the Catholic Bishops Conference of the Philippines (CBCP), expressed through a pastoral letter that even though The Da Vinci Code is a work of fiction, it "shapes the imagination, stirs emotions and forms mental associations" and added that "Brown has created the impression that his fiction is historical fact." Before the pastoral letter was written, Lipa Archdiocese Archbishop Ramon Arguelles, CBCP senior member, wrote Consoliza Laguardia, chairperson of the Movie and Television Classification Board (MTRCB), and requested her to prohibit the film's showing in the Philippines, where the majority are Christians, because of its "sacrilegious" and "blasphemous" nature.

Gaudencio Cardinal Rosales, archbishop of Manila, said that the film is a "vicious attack on the divinity of Jesus Christ." He also added that "not since the time of the Presbyter Arius was there an attack on the divinity of Jesus Christ, which was as vicious and as momentarily profitable as this venture of Dan Brown and Sony Film Productions." Although the CBCP and Rosales did not categorically demand a ban of the film, they have issued guidelines for Filipino Catholics on watching the movie.

Just like MTRCB's rating, Mario Sobrejuanite, vice chairman of the Catholic Bishops Conference of the Philippines-Catholic Initiative for Enlightened Movie Appreciation (CBCP-Cinema), rated The Da Vinci Code as R-18 and stated that the film is something that Catholics should not be afraid of. However, the CBCP-Cinema rated the moral assessment on the film as "disturbing."

Reactions from the Muslim community
The Moro Islamic Liberation Front Deputy Chairman Khaled Musa appealed to the MTRCB to ban the film, arguing that the film is blasphemous not only to Catholics but also to Muslims because Jesus Christ is considered one of the Prophets of Islam. Musa recalled Jyllands-Posten Muhammad cartoons controversy with regards to this film and further explained that freedom of expression should not "invade" freedom of religion.

Ban in Manila
The City Councilors of Manila passed a resolution to ban the film, labelling it as "offensive and contrary to established religious beliefs which cannot take precedence over the right of the persons involved in the film to freedom of expression." The Councilors who concur to the resolution cited the Revised Penal Code of the Philippines stating that showing a film that offends a religion is a crime, while Councilors who opposed the decision noted that the film is only fiction and for entertainment. It was stated that cinema owners not heeding to the ban would face a one-year jail term and a Php 5,000 fine, and those persons selling DVD or VCD copies of the film could be fined Php 3,000 and jailed for up to six months. It was not banned in any of the other cities in Metro Manila, making the film easily accessible to citizens living in the capital.

Ban in SM Malls
The SM Supermalls, the largest chain of shopping malls in the Philippines, prohibited the showing of The Da Vinci Code in all of their movie theaters throughout the country.  This decision is in line with their policy for not showing films that were rated by MTRCB as R-18.

Although The Da Vinci Code was banned in the City of Manila and all SM Malls, it was still shown in other cinemas all over the Philippines. Robinsons Malls Movieworld, Gaisano Cinemas, Ayala Malls Cinemas, Glorietta Cinemas are a few of the cinema companies that showed the film.

The film's sequels, Angels and Demons and Inferno, were permitted nonetheless to be shown in the entire Philippines.

Proposed abolition of MTRCB
Despite The Da Vinci Code's R-18 rating by the MTRCB, Filipino Congressman Bienvenido Abante Jr. rallied to abolish the MTRCB for allowing the film to be shown. Abante, who is also the president of the Metropolitan Baptist Church of the Philippines and called the movie as demonic and diabolical, filed House Bill 3269 that seeks to abolish the television and film board.

In Cebu City, city moralist Rene Josef Bullecer said that the law that created the MTRCB does not allow the showing of the movie.

References

2006 in the Philippines
The Da Vinci Code
Film controversies in the Philippines
Religious controversies in film
Religious controversies in the Philippines